Sandøya or Sandøy may refer to:

People
Brandur Sandoy (born 1973), a Faroese politician, sheep farmer and businessman
Paul Joakim Sandøy (born 1987), a Norwegian politician for the Conservative Party

Places
 Sandøya, Agder, an island in Tvedestrand municipality in Aust-Agder county, Norway
 Sandøya, Møre og Romsdal, an island in Sandøy municipality in Møre og Romsdal county, Norway
 Sandøya, Telemark, an island in Porsgrunn municipality in Telemark county, Norway
 Sandøya, Troms, an island in Tromsø municipality in Troms county, Norway
 Sandøy Church, a parish church in Sandøy Municipality in Møre og Romsdal county, Norway

See also 
 Sandoy
 Sandø (disambiguation)
 Sandøy municipality